Edgar Wirt Bagnell (November 20, 1890 – August 27, 1958) was a pioneer aviator who was a member of the Early Birds of Aviation. He was in charge of the 191st Combat Reconnaissance Squadron but by time his training ended World War I was over.

Biography
He was born near McCool Junction, Nebraska on November 20, 1890.

He learned to fly at Newport News, Virginia in 1915.  He was in charge of the 191st Combat Reconnaissance Squadron but by time his training ended World War I was over. After the war he worked for Glenn Curtiss as a test pilot in Houston, Texas. He later worked in the trucking industry, in the racing car business, in advertising, and outdoor sign painting. He later piloted for a Mexican airline.

While in Los Angeles, California in 1926 he was a student at the Chouinard Art School.

In his later life he had a job as a skilled machinist in Glendale, California. He died at a nursing home in Oakland, California on August 27, 1958.

References

Members of the Early Birds of Aviation
1890 births
1958 deaths